Hell for Certain may refer to:

Hell for Certain, Kentucky, an unincorporated community
Hell for Certain Branch, a stream in West Virginia